Promastodonsaurus ("before Mastodonsaurus") is an extinct genus of capitosauroid temnospondyls within the family Mastodonsauridae. Fossils of the genus were found in the Ischigualasto Formation of the Ischigualasto-Villa Unión Basin in northwestern Argentina.

References

Bibliography 
 

Stereospondyls
Carnian genera
Triassic temnospondyls of South America
Triassic Argentina
Fossils of Argentina
Ischigualasto Formation
Fossil taxa described in 1963
Taxa named by José Bonaparte